Academy of the Canyons (AOC) is a public middle college high school in Santa Clarita, California, United States. The school, which enrolls students from 9th to 12th grade, is part of the William S. Hart High School District.  It is located on the Valencia College of the Canyons campus, where students of AOC are concurrently enrolled. Students attending Academy of the Canyons take high school classes at the University Center and college courses at the College of the Canyons campus. During grades 9–12, students can earn up to 80 college units. A significant number of students at Academy of the Canyons have received one or more associate degrees by or before their high school graduation. Due to CIF regulations, students are not allowed to participate in high school or intercollegiate sports.

The school's motto/slogan is "Your Future Today".  The symbol or mascot of the school is the Golden Oak Tree. Students often refer to themselves as "AOC Oak Trees" or "Acorns."

Student demographics
As of the 2021-22 academic year, 395 students were enrolled at Academy of the Canyons. Of those students, 39.7% were Asian, 28.9% were non-Hispanic white, 21.5% were Hispanic or Latino, and 2.8 were African American. As of 2020-21, 59 students (14.3%) were eligible for free- or reduced-price lunch.

References

External links
Academy of the Canyons website

Educational institutions established in 2000
High schools in Los Angeles County, California
Public high schools in California
Education in Santa Clarita, California
2000 establishments in California